Eleni Klapanara (born ) is a Greek female  track cyclist, and part of the national team. She competed in the team sprint event at the 2010 UCI Track Cycling World Championships.

References

External links
 Profile at cyclingarchives.com

1973 births
Living people
Greek track cyclists
Greek female cyclists
Place of birth missing (living people)